Rapid City is a city in South Dakota

Rapid City may refer to the following places:

Canada 
 Rapid City, Manitoba

United States 
 Rapids City, Illinois
 Rapid City, Michigan, an unincorporated community of Clearwater Township, Michigan